Ungava may refer to:
The Ungava Peninsula, located in northern Quebec
Ungava (electoral district), the largest and most northern provincial electoral district of Quebec
Ungava Bay, on the northern coast of Quebec — on Hudson Strait
District of Ungava, a former district of the Canadian Northwest Territories, now divided into parts of Quebec and Labrador
An Inuit metal band
Ungava: a Tale of Esquimaux Land, 1857 novel by R. M. Ballantyne